Robert Sietsema is an American restaurant critic. He wrote reviews and articles for the Village Voice from 1993 to 2013. He has also contributed to Gourmet magazine. After being let go from the Voice in a round of downsizing, he was hired the following week by Eater, the New York City-based food website, as a feature writer before moving into the role of senior food critic.

Biography
Of Dutch descent, Sietsema is from the Midwest. Around 1978, he left college to move to New York City, where his wife-to-be was moving. He worked for a book publishing house and played bass in the band Mofungo alongside guitarist Elliott Sharp.

He started a newsletter called Down the Hatch and charged $10 a year for five issues.

References

External links
Robert Sietsema at the Village Voice
@RobertSietsema on Twitter

American restaurant critics
American male non-fiction writers
American bass guitarists
Living people
The Village Voice people
Year of birth missing (living people)